This is a timeline of the 2006 Lebanon War during late August.

20 August

21 August

22 August

23 August

24 August

25 August

26 August

27 August

28 August

29 August

30 August

31 August

References  	

2006 Lebanon War
2006 Lebanon War (late August)